The United Democratic Party is an unregistered political party in Kazakhstan.

History 
It was founded on 25 December 2001 with the merger of People's Congress of Kazakhstan, Republican People's Party of Kazakhstan, and the Azamat Democratic Party. The main reason was due to a need of a stronger, united opposition. 

Its Congress was held in January 2002. It did not participate in the 2004 Kazakh legislative election due to lack of funds.

Program 
The UDP advocated for a unicameral parliamentary republic, elections at local level, and snap elections for president and the parliament.

References

Political parties in Kazakhstan
Political parties established in 2001